In mathematics, the hypergeometric function of a matrix argument is a generalization of the classical hypergeometric series. It is a function defined by an infinite summation which can be used to evaluate certain multivariate integrals.

Hypergeometric functions of a matrix argument have applications in random matrix theory. For example, the distributions of the extreme eigenvalues of random matrices are often expressed in terms of the hypergeometric function of a matrix argument.

Definition

Let  and  be integers, and let
 be an  complex symmetric matrix.
Then the hypergeometric function of a matrix argument 
and parameter  is defined as

 

 is the "C" normalization of the Jack function.

Two matrix arguments

 

where  is the identity matrix of size .

Not a typical function of a matrix argument

Unlike other functions of matrix argument, such as the matrix exponential, which are matrix-valued, the hypergeometric function of (one or two) matrix arguments is scalar-valued.

The parameter α
In many publications the parameter  is omitted. For example, in the theory of real random matrices (see, e.g., Muirhead, 1984),  whereas in other settings (e.g., in the complex case—see Gross and Richards, 1989), .

The thing to remember is that

 

Typically, in settings involving real random matrices,  and thus .

References

 K. I. Gross and D. St. P. Richards, "Total positivity, spherical series, and hypergeometric functions of matrix argument", J. Approx. Theory, 59, no. 2, 224–246, 1989.
 J. Kaneko, "Selberg Integrals and hypergeometric functions associated with Jack polynomials", SIAM Journal on Mathematical Analysis, 24, no. 4, 1086-1110, 1993.
 Plamen Koev and Alan Edelman, "The efficient evaluation of the hypergeometric function of a matrix argument", Mathematics of Computation, 75, no. 254, 833-846, 2006.
 Robb Muirhead, Aspects of Multivariate Statistical Theory, John Wiley & Sons, Inc., New York, 1984.

External links
 Software for computing the hypergeometric function of a matrix argument by Plamen Koev.

Hypergeometric functions